Malyshevo is a rural locality (a village) in Nikolskoye Rural Settlement, Kaduysky District, Vologda Oblast, Russia. The population was 1 as of 2002.

Geography 
The distance to Kaduy is 34 km, to Nikolskoye is 10 km. Kulikovo is the nearest rural locality.

References 

Rural localities in Kaduysky District